The Dewoitine D.9 was a French monoplane fighter built by Dewoitine and built under licence in Italy as the Ansaldo AC.3.

Design and development
The D.9 was a single-seat high-wing monoplane with a conventional landing gear and powered by a  Gnome-Rhône 9Ab Jupiter radial engine. First flown in 1924 it was not accepted by the French Army being ranked sixth in the 1923 single-seat fighter competition. A small number of production aircraft were sold for export to Belgium and Yugoslavia and three were built from parts by EKW for the Swiss Air Force. The biggest achievement of the type was an order to licence-build 150 aircraft for the Italian Regia Aeronautica, built by Ansaldo as the Ansaldo AC.3. The type served into the 1930s with the Italian forces.

Operators

Belgian Air Force - two

Regia Aeronautica - 150 licence-built as the Ansaldo AC.3

Swiss Air Force, three licence-built by EKW

Yugoslav Royal Air Force - two

Specifications

See also

References

Notes

Bibliography

Dewoitine D.09
D.009
Ansaldo aircraft
Aircraft first flown in 1924